Puxada de Rede is a Brazilian folkloric theatrical play, seen in many capoeira performances. It is based on a traditional Brazilian legend.

Plot
A fisherman goes out to fish at night on a jangada, a handmade seaworthy sailing raft used by fishermen of north-eastern Brazil.  His wife has a presentiment of something wrong and tries to stop him from going fishing that night.  He goes anyway, leaving his wife crying and his kids scared.  His wife waits the whole night for him on the beach, and around 5:00am, the usual arrival time, she sees the jangada.  The fishermen have a very sad expression and some are even crying, but she does not see her husband.  The fishermen tell her that her husband has fallen off the jangada by accident.  As they start to withdraw the net, they find his body amongst the fish.  His friends carry his body on their arms, in a traditional funeral ritual on the beach.

Lyrics

English translation in italics where available.

NO MAR

No mar, no mar, no mar, no mar eu ouvi cantar
      In the sea, in the sea, in the sea, in the sea I heard singing
No mar, no mar, no mar minha sereia, ela é sereia
      In the sea, in the sea, in the sea my mermaid, she is a mermaid

MINHA JANGADA VAI SAIR P'RO MAR

Minha jangada vai sair p'ro mar
      My jangada is going out to sea
Vou trabalhar, meu bem querer
      I'm going to work, my love.
Se Deus quiser quando eu voltar do mar
      If God wants when I return from the sea
Um peixe bom, eu vou trazer
      A good fish, I will bring
Meus companheiros tambem vão voltar
      My friends will also return
E a Deus do céu vamos agradecer
      and to God we will give thanks

A REDE PUXA

A puxa a marra marinheiro
A rede puxa
A puxa lá que eu puxo cá
A rede puxa
A puxa a marra samangolê
A rede puxa

PUXA A MARRA MARINHEIRO

Puxa a marra marinheiro puxa a marra
E olha o vento que te leva pela a barra

Folk plays